The Razmgah Kammando of Iran (Persian: رزمگاه کماندو ایران) also known as Razmgah-e Kommando-ye Iran which is the sport-culture organization of the first Iranian epic and martial art was founded by Abdolhamid Bagherian Jamnani (nicknamed Yekita), in Feb 1984. The first attempts for the registration of this organization began in 1989. Razmgah was registered in the Ministry of Sport and Youth (Iran) on August 16, 1997, as the first Iranian culture and martial arts organization. 

The word Kammando (English: Commando) is interpreted by the founder of Razmgah in an interview with Radio Tehran (Persian: رادیو تهران) as one of the English words of Persian origin. According to that interpretation, Kammando is made up of Kamman (English: Arc) and Do (English: Two) and it means two upper and lower arcs referring to the physical and spiritual aspects of human being.

Establishment and promotion of the Iranian martial arts 

The Persian term Razmgah (English: Battlefield) refers to a sport-culture campus, which was established in 1993 in the Alborz forest mountain range in Zirab, Savadkuh County . As for bureaucracy and corruption in the administrative system, and in spite of the establishment of specialized deliberations in the Islamic Consultative Assembly in support of the first Iranian sport-culture project and the approval of the budget for the construction of the first Iranian martial arts campus, the efforts for receiving the budget approved by the parliament were fruitless. However, Razmgah was established within 14 years in the form of a sports training campus with five villa buildings and construction and sanitary facilities.

The peak of the popular acceptance among the people and some officials of the Islamic Republic of Iran was from 2005 to 2007, while two buildings named Mahan and Tabarestan and welfare services were under construction. The sporting and cultural events on the campus welcomed youngsters from 14 provinces of the country. Meanwhile, unsuccessful efforts in promoting the Razmgah and receiving government-funded assistance were made by Yekita.

Confrontations with authorities 

The widespread acceptance of the Razmgah by people attracted the authorities and some political parties requesting cooperation. The requests were denied by the founder as the community denounced any political cooperation with the Islamic Republic of Iran as being against the statute of the Razmgah.

On the morning of December 5, 2008, agents of the Ministry of Intelligence detained Yekita and the director of the Razmgah while they were on the way to the campus. The agents detained several members of the Razmgah within a week, which were sent to solitary confinements in a detention center of the Ministry of Intelligence located in Sari, Iran. All the detainees except the founder and his companion were released on bail within three months. Yekita and his companion were released on bail in September 2009. The Islamic Revolutionary Guard Corps's propaganda then described the Razmgah Kammando of Iran as a place of Evil emanating deviant thought.

The first attack to the Razmgah 

On November 3, 2012, a company of Armed Forces of the Islamic Republic of Iran, under the support of agents of the Ministry of Intelligence and companionship of an Islamic cleric (akhoond or Mullah) set off to the campus in Savadkuh County. The armed forces opened a way with a loader through seedlings and trees in the forest. After arresting several members of the Razmgah dwelt in Mahan building which was a Hussainiya and an education and reconciliation center, the armed forces demolished the building. They also demolished the sanitary facilities and an assembly hall called Alachiq building on the south side of the campus. A squad of armed forces also attacked to the central office of the Razmgah in Tehran on the same day.

The last demolishment of the campus 

The second major attack on Razmgah's campus happened in February 2015 by the armed forces. The troops demolished the left buildings and burnt the facilities. The prosecutor's attorney of Savadkuh issued an order to arrest members of the Razmgah, including those who had been detained in Dec 2008.
The first attack of the armed forces to the Razmgah was reported as a violation of Human rights in the Islamic Republic of Iran in the monthly journal Bashariyat published in Germany.

References

Sports organisations of Iran